Adenosinergic means "working on adenosine".

An adenosinergic agent (or drug) is a chemical which functions to directly modulate the adenosine system in the body or brain. Examples include adenosine receptor agonists, adenosine receptor antagonists (such as caffeine), and adenosine reuptake inhibitors.

See also
 Adrenergic
 Cannabinoidergic
 Cholinergic
 Dopaminergic
 GABAergic
 Glycinergic
 Histaminergic
 Melatonergic
 Monoaminergic
 Opioidergic
 Serotonergic

References
 https://thesupplementswiki.com/ingredients/theacrine-wiki/

Neurochemistry
Neurotransmitters